Pitwans is one of the villages in Patna district. Pitwans is present in block Naubatpur.The village is located on the banks of river Punpun, a tributary of river Ganges.

Demographics
According to [2001] census it has total 441 households with total population of 2,539 (male:1294 & female: 1254).

References

Villages in Patna district